Michael Glyn Fowler (born 20 November 1951) is a British Circuit judge.

He was educated at King's College London (LLB, 1973). He was called to the bar at Middle Temple in 1974 and served as a Recorder from 2000 to 2009.

References

1951 births
Living people
Alumni of King's College London